Sudha is a Kannada weekly magazine published in Bangalore.

History and profile
Sudha was established in 1965. The first issue appeared on 11 January 1965. It is published by The Printers (Mysore) Pvt. Ltd. The magazine covers articles on current affairs.  As of January 2014, the magazine completed 50 years in publication.

Cartoonists 
Sudha publishes a large number of cartoons, especially political cartoons. Some of its cartoonists include GM Bomnalli, V.Gopal, Prakash Shetty, Devidas Suvarna, Kandikatla, Indrali Guru, and Halambi etc. There are some cartoonists whose cartoons were printed in the magazine for first time. One of them is Vasuki CG.

Sister publications
 Deccan Herald, English Newspaper
 Prajavani, Kannada daily newspaper
 Mayura, Kannada Monthly

See also

 List of Kannada-language magazines
 Media in Karnataka
 Media in India

References

External links
 SudhaEzine.com

1965 establishments in Mysore State
News magazines published in India
Weekly magazines published in India
Kannada-language magazines
Magazines established in 1965
Mass media in Bangalore